The Codex Cumanicus is a linguistic manual of the Middle Ages, designed to help Catholic missionaries communicate with the Cumans, a nomadic Turkic people. It is currently housed in the Library of St. Mark, in Venice (BNM ms Lat. Z. 549 (=1597)).

The Codex was created in Crimea and is considered one of the oldest attestations of the Crimean Tatar language, which is of great importance for the history of Kipchak and Oghuz dialects — as directly related to the Kipchaks (Polovtsy, Kumans) of the Black Sea steppes and particularly the Crimean peninsula.

Origin and content
It consists of two parts. The first part consists of a dictionary in Latin, Persian and Cuman written in the Latin alphabet, and a column with Cuman verbs, names and pronouns with its meaning in Latin. The second part consists of Cuman-German dictionary, information about the Cuman grammar, and poems belonging to Petrarch. However the Codex referred to the language as "Tatar" (tatar til).

The first part of Codex Cumanicus was written for practical purposes, to help learn the language. The second part was written to spread Christianity among the Cumans and different quotes from the religious books were provided with its Cuman translation. In the same section there are words, phrases, sentences and about 50 riddles, as well as stories about the life and work of religious leaders.

The Codex likely developed over time. Mercantile, political, and religious leaders, particularly in Hungary, sought effective communication with the Cumans as early as the mid-11th century. As Italian city-states, such as Genoa, began to establish trade posts and colonies along the Black Sea coastline, the need for tools to learn the Kipchak language sharply increased.

The earliest parts of the Codex are believed to have originated in the 12th or 13th century. Substantial additions were likely made over time.  The copy preserved in Venice is dated 11 July 1303 on fol. 1r (see Drimba, p. 35 and Schmieder in Schmieder/Schreiner, p. XIII). The Codex consists of a number of independent works combined into one.

Riddles

The "Cuman Riddles" (CC, 119–120; 143–148) are a crucial source for the study of early Turkic folklore. Andreas Tietze referred to them as "the earliest variants of riddle types that constitute a common heritage of the Turkic nations."

Among the riddles in the Codex are the following excerpts:

"The white yurt has no mouth (opening). That is the egg."

"my bluish kid at the tethering rope grows fat, The melon."

"Where I sit is a hilly place. Where I tread is a copper bowl. The stirrup."

Example

The Codex's Pater Noster reads:

Codex Cumanicus sources
 Güner, Galip  (2016), Kuman Bilmeceleri Üzerine Notlar  (Notes on the Cuman Riddles), Kesit Press, İstanbul. 168 pp.
 Argunşah, Mustafa; Güner, Galip, Codex Cumanicus, Kesit Yayınları, İstanbul, 2015, 1080 pp. (https://www.academia.edu/16819097/Codex_Cumanicus)
 Dr. Peter B. Golden on the Codex
 Italian Part of “Codex Cumanicus”, pp. 1 - 55. (38,119 Mb)
 German Part of “Codex Cumanicus”, pp. 56 - 83. (5,294 Mb)
 Schmieder, Felicitas et Schreiner, Peter (eds.), Il Codice Cumanico e il suo mondo. Atti del Colloquio Internazionale, Venezia, 6-7 dicembre 2002. Roma, Edizioni di Storia e Letteratura, 2005, XXXI-350 p., ill. (Centro Tedesco di Studi Veneziani, Ricerche, 2).
 Drimba, Vladimir, Codex Comanicus. Édition diplomatique avec fac-similés, Bucarest 2000.
 Davud Monshizadeh, Das Persische im Codex Cumanicus, Uppsala: Studia Indoeuropaea Upsaliensia, 1969.

References

External links
 Codex Cumanicus on-line
 Full text of the Codex Cumanicus in Latin
 Golden, Peter B. "Codex Cumanicus". Provides an in depth overview of the book's content.
 Article in Encyclopædia Iranica: http://www.iranicaonline.org/articles/codex-cumanicus
Complete copy of Ligeti's Prolegomena and Kuun's Latin edition and commentary (as published in Budapest, 1981): https://library.hungaricana.hu/hu/view/MTAKonyvtarKiadvanyai_BORB_01/?pg=0&layout=s
Ligeti's Prolegomena: https://www.jstor.org/stable/23682271

14th-century books
14th-century Christian texts
Cumans
Riddles
Manuscripts
Cuman language